Tteok-galbi or grilled short rib patties is a Korean beef dish made with minced beef short ribs. Originally a royal dish, tteok-galbi is now a local specialty of Gyeonggi Province in the central-west region and South Jeolla Province in the south-west region of the Korean Peninsula.

Etymology 
Tteok-galbi, literally translated to "cake ribs" as tteok means "rice (or other grain) cake" and galbi means "rib". The name comes from the food's similarity in appearance to tteok. The process of kneading and shaping the meat is similar to the process of making a rice cake. The final dish is also soft and tender, much like a rice cake in texture.

The word tteok-galbi has a relatively short history that starts in the late 1960s to early 1970s. Before that, the dish was called hyo-galbi, meaning "filial piety ribs", or no-galbi, meaning "elder ribs", as it was often a dish for older people whose teeth were too weak to bite off meat from the rib bones. Both the terms hyo-galbi and no-galbi were used during the Joseon era (1392–1897).

History 
Tteok-galbi was a beef dish in Korean royal court cuisine. One story says the dish was created because it was not befitting for kings to gnaw on galbi-gui (grilled short ribs). Recipes from Gyeonggi Province that char-grill the beef are said to have been imparted from court ladies in the late Joseon era, while the recipes from South Jeolla Province were reportedly passed on by scholarly-officials in exile. The Damyang tteok-galbi, passed on by Song Hui-gyeong (1376–1446) is the most famous among them.

In modern South Korea, tteok-galbi is also made with ingredients mixed with or other than beef, such as pork and duck. Tteok-galbi made with half beef and half pork was first created and sold by Choe Jeo-ja in the 1950s, in Songjeong, Gwangju, South Korea. Now there is a "tteok-galbi street" specializing in the half beef and half pork dish in the Songjeong area. Ori-tteok-galbi, made with duck meat, is a popular dish in Gwangju.

Preparation 
Meat is separated from beef short ribs, finely minced, and marinated with various seasonings and aromatics, such as salt, ground black pepper, ginger juice, soy sauce, minced garlic, minced onion, cheongju (rice wine), sugar, and sesame oil. The marinade is boiled, sifted, and cooled beforehand. The marinated meat is shaped and attached back to the rib bones using a small amount of wheat flour as glue, and char-grilled over oak. Once on the gridiron, the meat patty is brushed with the sauce while it is grilled.

Songjeong tteok-galbi is made by shaping a mixture of beef and pork into rectangles and grilling. Pork is added to make it fattier since the beef is too dry by itself. The recipe of Choe Jeo-ja calls for hand-kneading the meat for a long time in a seasoning made from nearly 20 ingredients including dasima (kelp), pear and honey. The sauce is intermittently brushed on the meat while it is slowly grilled over charcoal.

Eating 
Chopsticks are used to cut tteok-galbi.

See also 
 Frikadeller
 Hamburg steak
 Meatloaf
 Patty
 Salisbury steak

References 

Beef dishes
Korean cuisine
Street food in South Korea
Ground meat